Biden v. Texas, 597 U.S. ___ (2022), was a United States Supreme Court case related to administrative law and immigration.

Background 

In December 2018 under the Trump administration, the United States Department of Homeland Security announced its promulgation of the Remain in Mexico policy, formally titled the Migrant Protection Protocols (MPP), which required asylum seekers to remain in Mexico while officials reviewed their case. In April 2019, the United States District Court for the Northern District of California enjoined its enforcement. In May 2019, the United States Court of Appeals for the Ninth Circuit stayed the preliminary injunction pending disposition of the appeal. In February 2020, the Ninth Circuit affirmed the preliminary injunction, over the dissent of Judge Ferdinand Fernandez, and in March, the same panel denied a request by the federal government to stay the injunction pending disposition of a petition for writ of certiorari in the Supreme Court of the United States. The Supreme Court granted that request, with Justice Sonia Sotomayor dissenting. In October 2020, the Supreme Court agreed to hear the appeal. After President Joe Biden took office in January 2021, the Court held the case in abeyance. It vacated the Ninth Circuit's judgment as moot in June after the government rescinded MPP.

In April 2021, Texas and Missouri challenged the rescission of MPP in the United States District Court for the Northern District of Texas. In August, Judge Matthew J. Kacsmaryk held the rescission of MPP was arbitrary and capricious, agreeing with the states that allowing asylum seekers to stay within the United States imposed undue costs on these states, and issued a permanent injunction. The United States Court of Appeals for the Fifth Circuit denied a stay pending appeal, as did the Supreme Court, the latter in a 6–3 vote. In December, the Fifth Circuit again ruled against the federal government, this time on the merits of the appeal.

The federal government filed a petition for a writ of certiorari.

Supreme Court 

Certiorari was granted in the case on February 18, 2022. Oral arguments were held on April 26, 2022. On June 30, 2022, the Supreme Court reversed the Fifth Circuit by a 5–4 vote and held that the federal government has the authority to revoke the Migrant Protection Protocols. It was ruled that the 1996 law which amended the Immigration and Nationality Act, and which was used to justify the authority Congress had over the Remain in Mexico policy, did not deny the President the authority to end the protocols.

Aftermath
The case was then returned to the lower courts for additional proceedings determining whether the Biden Administration’s action was "arbitrary and capricious" in violation of the Administrative Procedure Act, which governs how federal agencies develop and issue regulations. On December 15, 2022, U.S. district judge Matthew Kacsmaryk prevented the Biden Administration from officially ending the program by ruling that the policy should stay in place while legal challenges play out. However, Kacsmaryk did not order the policy reinstated. In February 2023, Mexico's Ministry of Foreign Affairs announced it rejects any efforts to reinstate the policy for asylum-seekers.

References

External links 
 

2022 in United States case law
United States Supreme Court cases
United States Supreme Court cases of the Roberts Court
United States immigration and naturalization case law